Notes from Big Sur is an album by jazz saxophonist Charles Lloyd, recorded in November 1991 by Lloyd with Bobo Stenson, Anders Jormin and Ralph Peterson.

Reception
The AllMusic review by David R. Adler stated: "Notes From Big Sur successfully portrays the California coastline for which it is named — picturesque and soothing, although rugged and at times forbidding".

Track listing
All compositions by Charles Lloyd

 "Requiem" - 8:00
 "Sister" - 8:51  
 "Pilgrimage to the Mountain Part 1: Persevere" - 7:22  
 "Sam Song" - 7:54  
 "Takur" - 4:27  
 "Monk in Paris" - 9:38
 "When Miss Jessye Sings" - 9:55  
 "Pilgrimage to the Mountain Part 2: Surrender" - 4:31

Personnel
Charles Lloyd - tenor saxophone
Bobo Stenson - piano
Anders Jormin - double bass
Ralph Peterson - drums

References

1992 albums
ECM Records albums
Charles Lloyd (jazz musician) albums
Albums produced by Manfred Eicher